Broughton High School is a coeducational secondary school located in Broughton in the English county of Lancashire.

Established in 1975, it is a community school administered by Lancashire County Council. The school was awarded specialist status in business and enterprise, and was renamed Broughton Business and Enterprise College for a time.

Broughton High School offers GCSEs, BTECs, NVQs and City and Guilds courses as programmes of study for pupils. Some courses are offered in conjunction with Preston's College and Myerscough College.

Notable former pupils
Helen Clitheroe, middle- and long-distance runner

References

External links
Broughton High School official website
BHS Past Pupils website

Secondary schools in Lancashire
Community schools in Lancashire
Educational institutions established in 1975
1975 establishments in England
Schools in the City of Preston
Broughton, Lancashire